Tara Dragas (born 17 February 2007) is an Italian rhythmic gymnast of Slovenian descent, member of the national team. She's the 2022 European ribbon junior medalist.

Personal life 
She took up rhythmic gymnastics at the age of four at the Associazione Sportiva Udinese, coached by her mother Špela Dragaš.

Career 
In December 2019 at the national championships in Catania, Tara won the all around national title in the pre junior category, as well as four gold medals in the finals with rope, balls, clubs and ribbon.

She debuted in the national team in November 2020 on the occasion of the bilateral between Italy and Germany held in Desio where she won the team silver medal. In December she represented Italy at the 3rd Online International Tournament in Moscow, where she won the silver medal with ribbon. In the same month she participated at nationals in Montegrotto Terme, where she got the silver medal in the All-Around, behind Alice Taglietti.

In May 2021 Dragas competed at the FIG International Tournament "Ritam Cup" in Belgrade, where she won the gold medal in the all-around with 85.750 points, as well as three golds  with hoop, clubs and ribbon, a silver with ball, and gold in teams along Giorgia Galli.

In 2022 she won 3 gold medals at the junior Mediterranean Games, 2 gold medals at World Cup in Portimão and silver with ribbon at the European Championships in Tel Aviv.

Routine music information

References 

2007 births
Living people
Italian rhythmic gymnasts
Medalists at the Rhythmic Gymnastics European Championships
21st-century Italian women
Italian Slovenes